Markkinointi & Mainonta, abbreviated as M&M, (meaning Marketing and Advertising in English) was a Finnish language marketing magazine. The magazine was started in 1994 by a group, including Kim Weckström, a Finnish entrepreneur. Its target audience was marketing professionals, including the managers and decision makers in the field. M&M was part of Alma Talent. As of 2009 Heimo Hatakka was the editor-in-chief of the magazine.

The magazine published annual lists such as Top 300 brands. The editors of the magazine joined a jury members in the Epica contest on Europe's best advertising. The last edition of the magazine appeared on 18 December 2020. The parent company, Alma Talent, also closed two other magazines, Metallitekniikan and Tekniikan Historian.

In 2018 M&M sold 3,500 copies.

See also
List of magazines in Finland

References

1994 establishments in Finland
2020 disestablishments in Finland
Business magazines published in Finland
Defunct magazines published in Finland
Finnish-language magazines
Magazines about advertising
Magazines established in 1994
Magazines disestablished in 2020
Magazines published in Helsinki